Under the Same Stars is an album by the American indie band The Prom.  It was released on July 9, 2002 on the Barsuk label.

Songs
 (An Introduction To) Under The Same Stars
 Living In The Past
 Guarantees Aren't Easy
 Ink On The Paper
 A Note On The Kitchen Table
 Brighter Than The Moon
 The Same Complaints
 The City Gets Lonely
 Room With White Walls
 A Note On The Kitchen Table (reprise)
 It's Not My Fault

Band members
James Mendenhall, lead vocalist and pianist
David Broecker, bassist
Joel Brown, drummer

References

2002 albums
The Prom (band) albums